Plexus pharyngeus or pharyngeal plexus can refer to:
 Pharyngeal plexus (venous) (plexus pharyngeus)
 Pharyngeal plexus of vagus nerve (plexus pharyngeus nervi vagi)